Ray Wilson is a former safety in the National Football League. He split the 1994 NFL season between the New Orleans Saints and the Green Bay Packers.

References

People from Panama City, Florida
New Orleans Saints players
Green Bay Packers players
American football defensive backs
New Mexico Lobos football players
1971 births
Living people